Dulangan-e Olya (also Romanized as Dūlangān-e ‘Olyā; also known as Dolangān-e Bālā, Dolangān-e ‘Olyā, and Dūlgān-e Bālā) is a village in Qaleh Shahin Rural District, in the Central District of Sarpol-e Zahab County, Kermanshah Province, Iran. At the 2006 census, its population was 322, in 74 families.

References 

Populated places in Sarpol-e Zahab County